Oopsis marshallensis is a species of beetle in the family Cerambycidae. It was described by Gressitt in 1956.

References

Oopsis
Beetles described in 1956